Ivan Eugene Doroschuk , born 9 October 1957, is an American-born Canadian musician. He is the lead vocalist and founding member of Men Without Hats, best known for the hit song "The Safety Dance".

Early life 
Ivan Doroschuk was born on 9 October 1957 in Champaign, Illinois to Ukrainian-Canadian parents Eugene and Betty Doroschuk.

Doroschuk and his younger brothers Stefan and Colin were born in the United States while their father was pursuing a doctorate at the University of Illinois at Urbana–Champaign. Eugene Doroschuk received his PhD in 1962, and accepted a teaching position at the Université de Montréal. Betty Doroschuk became a member of the music faculty at Montreal's McGill University, teaching classical voice. The three brothers, all classically trained musicians, grew up in the Montreal borough of Outremont, Quebec.

In 1976, at the age of 18, Doroschuk briefly studied law in the south of France, returning to Montreal in 1977. At McGill University, he was a student in the Film and Communications program.

Musical career

Doroschuk formed the Canadian new wave/synthpop group Men Without Hats in 1977, earning worldwide success with "The Safety Dance" in 1983 and "Pop Goes the World" in 1987. Men Without Hats started out as a new wave band, but the band's sound changed throughout the 1980s, adding more rock influence and transitioning to hard rock by the end of 1990.

In 1997, recording under the name Ivan, he released a solo album, The Spell, followed by a 1999 tour to promote the album.

Doroschuk attempted to revive Men Without Hats in 2003 with his release of the band's comeback album No Hats Beyond This Point, but did not reform the group for a tour or live performances. The studio album used material originally intended for Doroschuk's unreleased second solo album Mote in God's Eye.  Apart from a 2003 interview on VH1's True Spin, and a 2008 SOCAN Awards Gala where he was presented with an award for "The Safety Dance", Doroschuk made few public appearances during the 2000s.

In 2010, a full revival and reformation of the group Men Without Hats took place, with Doroschuk recruiting three new members. In 2012, they released the album Love in the Age of War, in which Doroschuk returned the band to its early-1980s synthpop sound by creating an intentional follow-up album to 1982's Rhythm of Youth.

Personal life 
Doroschuk married in the late 1990s but later divorced. He has one son, age , and was a stay-at-home father before reforming Men Without Hats. He resides in Victoria, British Columbia.

References 

1957 births
Living people
American emigrants to Canada
American people of Ukrainian descent
Canadian male singers
Canadian new wave musicians
Canadian pop singers
Canadian rock singers
Canadian people of Ukrainian descent
Male new wave singers
Musicians from Victoria, British Columbia
Musicians from Champaign, Illinois
Singers from Montreal
Anglophone Quebec people
Men Without Hats members